John Rae may refer to:

Sportsmen
Johnny Rae (rugby league), rugby league footballer of the 1960s for Great Britain and Bradford Northern
John Rae (New Zealand footballer), New Zealand international football (soccer) player
John Rae (footballer, born 1862) (1862–1917), Scottish footballer for Third Lanark, Sunderland, Scotland
John Rae (footballer, born 1912) (1912–2007), Scottish footballer for Dumbarton, East Stirlingshire, Bristol Rovers

Musicians
Johnny Rae (born 1934), American jazz drummer
John Rae (musician) (born 1966), Scottish jazz drummer
Jackie Rae (1922–2006), Canadian singer-songwriter

Others
John Rae (actor) (1896–1985), Scottish actor
John Rae (economist) (1796–1872), Scottish economist and author of Statement of Some New Principles on the Subject of Political Economy
John Rae (explorer) (1813–1893), Scottish explorer of the Arctic
John Rae (administrator) (1813–1900), Australian administrator, painter and author
John Rae (biographer) (1845–1915), Scottish journalist and biographer of Adam Smith
John Rae (politician) (1904–1979), politician of the New Zealand National Party
John Rae (headmaster) (1931–2006), English novelist, journalist and headmaster
John A. Rae (born 1945), Canadian businessman, political organizer, and political adviser
John B. Rae (1838–1922), American labour leader in 1890s
John Rae (artist) (1882–1963), American illustrator, children's book author, and portraitist; author of the 1917 New Adventures of Alice
John Rae (minister), 17th century Scottish minister who died, in prison, on the Bass Rock

See also
John Ray (disambiguation)
Johnny Ray (disambiguation)
John Wray (disambiguation)